Sydenham railway station may refer to:

Sydenham railway station (Northern Ireland)
Sydenham railway station (London)
Sydenham Hill railway station 
Sydenham railway station, Sydney 
Watergardens railway station, Melbourne, renamed from Sydenham to tie in with the adjacent shopping centre.